Panacea is the goddess of healing in Greek mythology.

Panacea may also refer to:

 Panacea (medicine), a cure-all, either physical medication or a solution to a problem
 Panacea (group), an American hip-hop duo
 Panacea, Florida, an unincorporated community in U.S.
 Panacea Biotec, an Indian pharmaceutical and health-management research company
 Panacea Society, a religious group based in Bedford, England
 The Panacea or Mathis Mootz, a German electronic musician, DJ and producer
 Panacea (butterfly), a butterfly genus in the subfamily Biblidinae
 Panacea, a character in the Asterix series by René Goscinny and Albert Uderzo
 Panacea, a section of "The Fountain of Lamneth", a song by Rush

See also 
 Remedy (disambiguation)